Current Zoology is a bimonthly peer-reviewed open access scientific journal of zoology. It was established in 1935 as Acta Zoologica Sinica, obtaining its current name in 2009. It is published by Oxford University Press and sponsored by both the Institute of Zoology, Chinese Academy of Sciences and the China Zoological Society. The editor-in-chief is Ya-Ping Zhang (Kunming Institute of Zoology). According to the Journal Citation Reports, the journal has a 2020 impact factor of 2.624, ranking it 25th out of 175 journals in the category "Zoology".

References

External links

Zoology journals
Oxford University Press academic journals
Publications established in 1935
English-language journals
Open access journals
Bimonthly journals